Wilbraham Almshouses or Wilbraham's Almshouses may refer to any of several almshouses founded by members of the Wilbraham family, including:

Old Maids' Almshouse, Welsh Row, Nantwich – founded by Roger Wilbraham (1676) (see Widows' Almshouses, Nantwich)
Tollemache Almshouses, 118–128 Welsh Row, Nantwich (1870)
Widows' Almshouses, Nantwich, 26–30 Welsh Row – founded by Roger Wilbraham (1676)
Wilbraham's Almshouses, Acton – founded by Sir Roger Wilbraham (1613)
Wilbraham's Almshouses, Barnet – founded by Sir Roger Wilbraham (1616)
Wilbraham's Almshouses, Nantwich, 112–116 Welsh Row – founded by Sir Roger Wilbraham (1613)